Woodbury Center is a census-designated place (CDP) in Litchfield County, Connecticut, United States. It comprises the twin villages of Woodbury and North Woodbury and surrounding residential land in the town of Woodbury. As of the 2010 census, the population of the CDP was 1,294, out of 9,975 in the entire town.

Geography
The Woodbury Center CDP is in the south-central part of the town of Woodbury, in the valley of the Pomperaug River. The CDP is bordered to the east by Bacon Pond Road; to the south by Old Sherman Hill Road, South Pomperaug Avenue, and Pomperaug Road; to the west by the Pomperaug River; and to the north by the Nonewaug River, a tributary of the Pomperaug.

U.S. Route 6 passes north to south through the community as Main Street. Route 6 leads northeast  to Watertown and south  to Southbury and an interchange with Interstate 84. Connecticut Route 47 begins in North Woodbury and leads northwest  to Washington. Connecticut Route 317 has its eastern terminus in Woodbury village and leads west  to Roxbury.

Demographics
As of the census of 2010, there were 1,294 people, 642 households, and 339 families residing in the CDP. There were 704 housing units, of which 62, or 8.8%, were vacant. The racial makeup of the CDP was 93.6% White, 0.7% African American, 4.3% Asian, 0.4% some other race, and 1.1% from two or more races. Hispanic or Latino of any race were 2.4% of the population.

Of the 642 households in the community, 20.4% had children under the age of 18 living with them, 39.6% were headed by married couples living together, 9.0% had a female householder with no husband present, and 47.2% were non-families. 39.9% of all households were made up of individuals, and 15.1% were someone living alone who was 65 years of age or older. The average household size was 2.02, and the average family size was 2.72.

17.3% of the CDP population were under the age of 18, 6.8% were from 18 to 24, 24.4% were from 25 to 44, 34.2% were from 45 to 64, and 17.3% were 65 years of age or older. The median age was 45.6 years. For every 100 females, there were 84.1 males. For every 100 females age 18 and over, there were 84.8 males.

For the period 2013-17, the estimated median annual income for a household in the CDP was $63,368, and the median income for a family was $75,139. Male full-time workers had a median income of $82,143 versus $37,035 for females. About 5.6% of families and 7.0% of the population were living below the poverty line, including 8.8% of those under age 18.

References

Woodbury, Connecticut
Villages in Litchfield County, Connecticut
Census-designated places in Litchfield County, Connecticut